Arkansas Highway 74 (AR 74 and Hwy. 74) is a series of state highways of  total in Northwest and north central Arkansas and is divided into eight separate sections.

Route description

The westernmost section route begins in Devil's Den State Park at AR 170. The route winding out of the park heading east. AR 74 crosses I-49 at exit 45 before ending at US 71 in Winslow.

A second segment begins at US 71 just north of Winslow and runs east approximately  before becoming County Road 43 (CR 43).

Section 3 begins at AR 16 in Elkins, running approximately  before ending at US 412B in Huntsville.

A fourth section begins at AR 23 south of Huntsville, heading east  before ending at AR 21 in Kingston.

South of Jasper, AR 74 resumes again, passing through unincorporated areas of Newton County. The route meets AR 123 in Piercetown and runs concurrently for  before splitting off at Mount Judea. From there, it continues  miles to Bass, where it terminates at Cave Road.

AR 74 begins a seventh section in Snowball at AR 377. The route runs  to meet US 65 north of Marshall.

South of Marshall, AR 74 resumes, following AR 27 for  before splitting off. It continues another  before ending at AR 66 east of Thola.

Major intersections

See also

References

External links

074
Transportation in Washington County, Arkansas
Transportation in Madison County, Arkansas
Transportation in Newton County, Arkansas
Transportation in Searcy County, Arkansas